Tokyo Revengers is an anime adaptation of the manga series written and illustrated by Ken Wakui. Produced by Liden Films, it is written by Yasuyuki Mutō, Yoriko Tomita, and Seiko Takagi. Koichi Hatsumi, Keiko Ōta, Satoki Iida and Hiroaki Tsutsumi are in charge of direction, character designs, sound direction and music composition respectively. The 24-episode season aired from April 11 to September 19, 2021. The series airs on MBS and is licensed Muse Communication in Southeast Asia and South Asia, streaming on the Muse Asia YouTube channel and Bilibili. Crunchyroll is streaming the series outside of Asia, including a Russian version and Spanish, Portuguese, French, German, and English dubs. The English dub premiered on May 29, 2021. It is also available to stream on VRV for audiences outside of Asia. A series of anime shorts featuring chibi versions of the characters, titled , were produced by Studio Puyukai, which began airing on April 12, 2021.

Three pieces of theme music are used for Tokyo Revengers series. Official Hige Dandism performed the opening theme song, "Cry Baby", which plays on all 24 episodes while eill performed the series' first ending theme song  which plays for the first 12 episodes. The second ending, which plays on all remaining episodes, is "Tokyo Wonder" performed by Nakimushi.

The second season, Tokyo Revengers: Christmas Showdown, premiered on January 8, 2023. Official Hige Dandism performed the opening theme song , while Tuyu performed the ending theme song .


Series overview

Episode list

Season 1 (2021)

Season 2: Christmas Showdown (2023)

Notes

References

External links
  

Tokyo Revengers